Ipswich Baptist Church is a historic church at Main Street and 3rd Avenue in Ipswich, South Dakota, USA, that includes Gothic Revival architecture.  It was built in 1924.

It was added to the National Register in 1978.

It was a work of Ursa Louis Freed, an architect who worked in North and South Dakota, who also co-designed the 1929 Codington County Courthouse,.  The courthouse and works of Freed in Aberdeen and Faith, South Dakota, are also listed on the National Register.

References

Baptist churches in South Dakota
Churches on the National Register of Historic Places in South Dakota
Gothic Revival church buildings in South Dakota
Churches completed in 1924
Buildings and structures in Edmunds County, South Dakota
National Register of Historic Places in Edmunds County, South Dakota